Crescendo van Berkel (born 6 April 1992) is a Dutch footballer who plays as a centre back for SVV Scheveningen in the Tweede Divisie.

Club career
Van Berkel came through the youth system at hometown club Quick and made his professional debut for Sparta Rotterdam in 2012. He was snapped up by Roda JC in 2014. He joined Telstar in summer 2015 after his contract with Roda expired.

He was signed by Norwegian club Sandefjord in Autumn 2017, and played 9 matches for the club, before being released in May 2018.

On 13 July 2018, Hong Kong club Lee Man announced the signing of van Berkel, and he made his debut on 31 August 2018. His contract is terminated in March 2019.

In February 2020, Van Berkel moved to SVV Scheveningen.

References

External links
 Crescendo van Berkel Interview
 
 Voetbal International profile 

1992 births
Living people
Footballers from The Hague
Association football central defenders
Dutch footballers
Dutch expatriate footballers
Sparta Rotterdam players
Roda JC Kerkrade players
SC Telstar players
Eerste Divisie players
Sandefjord Fotball players
Eliteserien players
Expatriate footballers in Norway
Lee Man FC players
Hong Kong Premier League players
Expatriate footballers in Hong Kong
Dutch expatriate sportspeople in Hong Kong
Dutch expatriate sportspeople in Norway
SVV Scheveningen players
Tweede Divisie players